Bacteroides thetaiotaomicron (formerly Bacillus thetaiotaomicron) is a species of bacterium of the genus Bacteroides. It is a gram-negative obligate anaerobe. It is one of the most common bacteria found in human gut microbiota and is also an opportunistic pathogen. Its genome contains numerous genes specialized in digestion of polysaccharides. It is often used in research as a model organism for functional studies of the human microbiota.

History and taxonomy
Bacteroides thetaiotaomicron was first described in 1912 under the name Bacillus thetaiotaomicron and moved to the genus Bacteroides in 1919. It was originally isolated from adult human feces. The specific name derives from the Greek letters theta, iota, and omicron; the List of Prokaryotic names with Standing in Nomenclature indicates this as "relating to the morphology of vacuolated forms". The name is used as an example of an "arbitrary" species name in the International Code of Nomenclature of Prokaryotes.

Genome
The genome of B. thetaiotaomicron was sequenced in 2003. It is 6.26 megabases in length, but has a relatively small number of distinct genes, due to many genes coding for proteins that are unusually large compared to other prokaryotes. This genomic feature is shared with another member of the genus with a similar lifestyle, Bacteroides fragilis. The genome is notable for containing very large numbers of genes associated with breaking down polysaccharides, including glycoside hydrolases and starch binding proteins.
The genome also contains large numbers of genes encoding proteins involved in sensing and responding to the extracellular environment, such as sigma factors and two-component systems. The B. thetaiotaomicron genome also encodes a large number of small non-coding RNAs, though few have been characterized to date.

Metabolism
Bacteroides thetaiotaomicron is capable of metabolizing a very diverse range of polysaccharides. Its complement of enzymes for hydrolysis of glycosidic bonds is among the largest known in prokaryotes, and it is thought to be capable of hydrolyzing most glycosidic bonds in biological polysaccharides. As a component of the human gut flora, it can use both dietary carbohydrates and those sourced from the host, depending on nutrient availability.

Although it is considered an obligate anaerobe, B. thetaiotaomicron is aerotolerant and can survive, but not grow, when exposed to oxygen. It expresses a number of proteins that scavenge reactive oxygen species such as hydrogen peroxide when exposed to air.

Role in the human microbiome
Bacteroides thetaiotaomicron is one of the most common components of the human gut flora. In a long-term study of Bacteroides species in clinical samples, B. thetaiotaomicron was the second most common species isolated, behind Bacteroides fragilis. B. thetaiotaomicron is considered commensal or symbiotic. However, it is also an opportunistic pathogen and can infect tissues exposed to gut flora. Its polysaccharide-metabolizing abilities make it a food source for other components of the microbiome. For example, while B. thetaiotaomicron expresses sialidase enzymes, it cannot catabolize sialic acid; as a result its presence increases the free sialic acid available for other organisms in the gut. These interactions can contribute to the growth of pathogenic bacteria such as Clostridium difficile, which uses sialic acid as a carbon source. Similar interactions can cause B. thetaiotaomicron to exacerbate pathogenic E. coli infection.

References

Gut flora bacteria
Gram-negative bacteria
Bacteroidia